Esaiah Pello Benson (born March 27, 1982 in Monrovia) is a former footballer as a defender who previously plays for Persitara Jakarta Utara. He is also a member of the Liberia national team.

References

External links 

1984 births
Living people
Liberian footballers
Liberia international footballers
Association football defenders
Expatriate footballers in Indonesia
Expatriate footballers in Malaysia
Sportspeople from Monrovia
Liberian expatriates in Indonesia
Liberian expatriates in Malaysia
PSIS Semarang players
PSIM Yogyakarta players
Persita Tangerang players
Arema F.C. players
Persitara Jakarta Utara players
Persiraja Banda Aceh players
Persiram Raja Ampat players
Perlis FA players
Indonesian Premier Division players
Liga 1 (Indonesia) players
Malaysia Super League players
Naturalised citizens of Indonesia